Jean II de Brouchoven, 2nd Count of Bergeyck (October 9, 1644 - May 21, 1725), was a Flemish politician who later was recognised as Baron of Leefdael.

Life 
He was the son of Jean-Baptiste de Brouchoven, 1st Count of Bergeyck, and Helena Fourment, Countess of Bergeyck. His younger brother Hyacinthe-Marie de Brouchoven was president of the Great Council. Jean married Livina Marie de Beer-Meulebeke, and became the father of Nicholas de Brouchoven, 3rd Count of Bergeyck.

Career 
He was in service of the Spanish Crown as Superintendent of Finances and Minister of War. He was a member of the Royal Council and of the Supreme Council of Flanders in Madrid, and special envoy of Philip V of Spain to the Congress of Utrecht, but without participating in the final negotiations.

After his death he was buried in Leefdaal.

References

Brouchoven family
Diplomats of the Habsburg monarchy
Military personnel of the Spanish Netherlands
1644 births
1725 deaths
Politicians from Antwerp
People of the War of the Spanish Succession
18th-century Dutch diplomats
17th-century Dutch diplomats